Lương Thùy Linh (born 15 August 2000) is a Vietnamese model and beauty pageant titleholder who was crowned Miss World Vietnam 2019. She represented Vietnam at the Miss World 2019 pageant, where she placed in the Top 12.

Early life and education 

Thùy Linh was born and raised in Cao Bằng, Vietnam. She is a former student of the Math Class of Cao Bằng High School for the Gifted. She used to be a member of the team that participated in the 2018 Vietnam National Excellent Student Contest in English, she was also honored as one of the candidates of Cao Bằng province with the highest test scores in the Vietnam's College Entrance Exam in 2018. She is currently a student of Foreign Trade University.

Pageantry

Miss World Vietnam 2019 
Linh was crowned Miss World Vietnam 2019 on August 3, 2019 at the Cocobay in Danang. She succeeded outgoing by Miss World Vietnam 2018, Trần Tiểu Vy.

Miss World 2019 
Thùy Linh represented Vietnam at the Miss World 2019 pageant in London, United Kingdom on 14 December 2019. She was called in the Top 40, and ultimately reached the Top 12 semifinals.

References

External links

2000 births
Living people
Miss World 2019 delegates
People from Cao Bằng Province
Vietnamese female models
Vietnamese beauty pageant winners
21st-century Vietnamese women